Creekland Middle School  may refer to:
 Creekland Middle School (Gwinnett County, Georgia)
 Creekland Middle School, Cherokee County, Georgia